This article lists some galaxy groups and galaxy clusters.

Defining the limits of galaxy clusters is imprecise as many clusters are still forming. In particular, clusters close to the Milky Way tend to be classified as galaxy clusters even when they are much smaller than more distant clusters.

Clusters exhibiting strong evidence of dark matter 

Some clusters exhibiting strong evidence of dark matter.

Named groups and clusters 

This is a list of galaxy groups and clusters that are well known by something other than an entry in a catalog or list, or a set of coordinates, or a systematic designation.

Clusters

Groups 

The major nearby groups and clusters are generally named after the constellation they lie in. Many groups are named after the leading galaxy in the group. This represents an ad hoc systematic naming system.

Groups and clusters visible to the unaided eye 

The Local Group contains the largest number of visible galaxies with the naked eye. However, its galaxies are not visually grouped together in the sky, except for the two Magellanic Clouds. The IC342/Maffei Group, the nearest galaxy group, would be visible by the naked eye if it were not obscured by the stars and dust clouds in the Milky Way's spiral arms.

 No galaxy cluster is visible to the unaided eye.

Firsts

Extremes

Closest groups

Closest clusters

Farthest clusters 

 In 2003 RDCS 1252-29 (RDCS1252.9–2927) at z=1.237, was found to be the most distant rich cluster, which lasted until 2005.
 In 2000, a cluster was announced in the field of quasar QSO 1213-0017 at z=1.31 (the quasar lies at z=2.69) 
 In 1999, cluster RDCS J0849+4452 (RX J0849+4452, RXJ0848.9+4452) was found at z=1.261 
 In 1995 and 2001, the cluster around 3C 294 was announced, at z=1.786 
 In 1992, observations of the field of cluster Cl 0939+4713 found what appears to be a background cluster near a quasar, also in the background. The quasar was measured at z=2.055 and it was assumed that the cluster would be as well.
 In 1975, 3C 123 and its galaxy cluster was incorrectly determined to lie at z=0.637 (actually z=0.218) 
 In 1958, cluster Cl 0024+1654 and Cl 1447+2619 were estimated to have redshifts of z=0.29 and z=0.35 respectively. However, they were not spectroscopically determined.

Farthest protoclusters 

 In 2002, a very large, very rich protocluster, or the most distant protosupercluster was found in the field of galaxy cluster MS 1512+36, around the gravitationally lensed galaxy MS 1512-cB58, at z=2.724

False clusters 

Sometimes clusters are put forward that are not genuine clusters or superclusters. Through the researching of member positions, distances, peculiar velocities, and binding mass, former clusters are sometimes found to be the product of a chance line-of-sight superposition.

See also 

 Lists of astronomical objects
 Galaxy cluster
 Galaxy group
 Illustris project
 List of galaxies

Lists of groups and clusters 

 Catalogue of Galaxies and of Clusters of Galaxies
 Hickson Compact Group
 List of Abell clusters
 List of galaxy superclusters
 Lyons Groups of Galaxies
 Virgo Supercluster

References

External links 

 ; Abell's 1957 cluster list

Galaxy clusters
Galaxy groups and clusters